English criminal law concerns offences, their prevention and the consequences, in England and Wales. Criminal conduct is considered to be a wrong against the whole of a community, rather than just the private individuals affected. The state, in addition to certain international organisations, has responsibility for crime prevention, for bringing the culprits to justice, and for dealing with convicted offenders. The police, the criminal courts and prisons are all publicly funded services, though the main focus of criminal law concerns the role of the courts, how they apply criminal statutes and common law, and why some forms of behaviour are considered criminal. The fundamentals of a crime are a guilty act (or actus reus) and a guilty mental state (or mens rea). The traditional view is that moral culpability requires that a defendant should have recognised or intended that they were acting wrongly, although in modern regulation a large number of offences relating to road traffic, environmental damage, financial services and corporations, create strict liability that can be proven simply by the guilty act.

Defences exist to crimes. A person who is accused may in certain circumstances plead they are insane and did not understand what they were doing, that they were not in control of their bodies, they were intoxicated, mistaken about what they were doing, acted in self defence, acted under duress or out of necessity, or were provoked. These are issues to be raised at trial, for which there are detailed rules of evidence and procedure to be followed.

History

England and Wales does not have a Criminal Code, though such an enactment has been often recommended and attempted (see English Criminal Code). Many criminal offences are common law offences rather being specified in legislation.

In 1980, a Committee of JUSTICE said that, upon conducting a search, they found over 7,200 offences, and that they thought that there were probably many more. They said that "it is now impossible to ascertain the entire content of the criminal law at any given time". In 1989, the Law Commission said that a hypothetical criminal code that contained all existing criminal offences would be "impossibly bulky". In 2001, Peter Glazebrook said the criminal law was "voluminous, chaotic and contradictory". In March 2011, there were more than ten thousand offences excluding those created by by-laws.

In 1999, P J Richardson said that as the case for a moratorium on legislation in the field of criminal justice was becoming stronger and stronger, governments seemed ever more determined to bring forward more legislation.

Treason Act 1351 and Hanged, drawn and quartered. Petty treason and High treason in the United Kingdom
Suppression of Heresy Act 1414 and John Wycliffe
Carrier's Case (1473) YB Pasch 13 Edw. IV, f. 9., pl. 5, larceny
Jesuits, etc. Act 1584
Bushel’s Case (1670) 124 E.R. 1006 writ of habeas corpus
Habeas Corpus Act 1679
Transportation Act 1717
Black Act 1723
Jacobite rising of 1745 and Transportation Act 1746 and 1768
Murder Act 1751
King v Pear (1779) 168 Eng Rep 208, larceny by trick
Trial of Lord George Gordon (1781) for treason for the Gordon riots
Case of the Dean of St Asaph or R v Shipley (1784) 4 Doug 73, seditious libel 
Burning of women in England and Treason Act 1790
Bazeley's Case (1799) 2 East P.C. 571, establishing crime of embezzlement
Debtors' prison
Offences Against the Person Act 1828
Bloody Code
Forfeiture Act 1870
Capital punishment in the United Kingdom
C [2009] UKHL 42
Clingham v RB Kensington and Chelsea [2002] UKHL 39
Collins v DPP [2006] UKHL 40
JTB [2009] UKHL 20
R v K [2001] UKHL 41
Norris v United States [2008] UKHL 16
R (Purdy) v DPP [2009] UKHL 45
R v Rahman [2008] UKHL 45
GG plc [2008] UKHL 17 
R v Rimmington and Goldstein [2005] UKHL 63
R v Saik [2006] UKHL 18
R v Sheldrake [2004] UKHL 43
Hashnan and Harrup (2000) 30 EHRR 241

Criminal law elements
The two basic elements of a crime are the act of doing that which is criminal, and the intention to carry it out. In Latin this is called the actus reus and the mens rea. In many crimes however, there is no necessity of showing a guilty mind, which is why the term "strict liability" is used.

Actus reus

Actus reus is Latin for "guilty act" and is the physical element of committing a crime. It is usually the application or threat of unlawful force, though exceptionally an omission or failure to act can result in liability. Simple examples might be A hitting B with a stick, or X pushing Y down a water well. These are guilty acts and the unlawful application or force. Alternatively, one may have a pre-existing duty to another person and by deliberately not performing it, one commits a crime. For instance, not giving food is an omission rather than an act, but as a parent one has a duty to feed one's children. Pre-existing duties can arise also through contract, a voluntary undertaking, a blood relation with whom one lives, and occasionally through one's official position. As the 19th century English judge, Lord Coleridge CJ wrote,

“It would not be correct to say that every moral obligation involves a legal duty; but every legal duty is founded on a moral obligation.”

Furthermore, one can become bound by a duty to take reasonable steps to correct a dangerous situation that one creates. In R v Miller a squatter flicked away a still lit cigarette, which landed on a mattress. He failed to take action, and after the building had burned down, he was convicted of arson. He failed to correct the dangerous situation he created, as he was duty bound to do. In many countries in Europe and North America, Good Samaritan laws also exist, which criminalize failure to help someone in distress (e.g. a drowning child). On the other hand, it was held in the U.K. that switching off the life support of someone in a persistent vegetative state is an omission to act and not criminal. Since discontinuation of power is not a voluntary act, not grossly negligent, and is in the patient's best interests, no crime takes place.

If someone's act is to have any consequence legally, it must have in some way caused a victim harm. The legal definition of "causation" is that "but for" the defendant's conduct, the victim would not have been harmed. If more than one cause for harm exists (e.g. harm comes at the hands of more than one culprit) the rule states that to be responsible, one's actions must have "more than a slight or trifling link" to the harm. Another important rule of causation is that one must "take his victim as he finds him." For instance, if P gives his friend Q a playful slap on the head, but Q suffers from a rare cranial condition and dies, then P can be guilty of manslaughter regardless of how unlucky he is to have bickered with Q. This is known as the thin skull rule.

Between the defendant's acts and the victim's harm, the chain of causation must be unbroken. It could be broken by the intervening act (novus actus interveniens) of a third party, the victim's own conduct, or another unpredictable event. A mistake in medical treatment usually will not break the chain, unless the mistakes are in themselves "so potent in causing death." For instance, if emergency medics dropped a stab victim on the way to the hospital and performed the wrong resuscitation, the attacker would not be absolved of the crime.

The interplay between causation and criminal responsibility is notoriously difficult, and many outcomes are criticized for their harshness to the unwitting defendant and sidestepping of hospitals' or the victim's own liability. In R v Dear a stab victim reopened his wounds while in the hospital and died. But despite this suicidal behavior, the attacker was still held fully responsible for murder.

R v Holland (1841) 2 Mood. & R. 351 break in causal chain 
R v Instan (1893) 1 QB 450 duty of care, to not omit to help some dying of gangrene
R v Smith (Thomas Joseph) [1959] QB, negligence of medics does not stop murder
R v Hughes [2013] UKSC 56, driver who was not as fault for a crash could not be responsible for others deaths although he was prosecuted for driving without a licence or insurance

Mens rea

Mens rea is another Latin phrase, meaning "guilty mind". It is the mental element of committing a crime and establishes the element of intent. Together with an actus reus, mens rea forms the bedrock of criminal law, although strict liability offenses have encroached on this notion. A guilty mind means intending to do that which harms someone. Intention under criminal law is separate from a person's motive. R v Mohan [1975] 2 All ER 193, intention defined as "a decision to bring about... [the actus reus] no matter whether the accused desired that consequence of his act or not." In the special case of murder, the defendant must have appreciated (i.e. consciously recognized) that either death or serious bodily harm would be the result of his actions. In R v Woolin, a man in a fit of temper threw his three-month-old son onto a wall, causing head injuries from which he died. Although death was certain and the father should have realized, he did not in the least desire that his son be killed or harmed. The English House of Lords sentenced him for manslaughter, but not murder. If a defendant has foresight of death or serious injury the jury may, but is not bound to, find the requisite mens rea.

A lower threshold of mens rea is satisfied when a defendant recognizes that some act is dangerous but decides to commit it anyway. This is recklessness. For instance if C tears a gas meter from a wall to get the money inside, and knows this will let flammable gas escape into a neighbor's house, he could be liable for poisoning. This is called "subjective recklessness," though in some jurisdictions "objective recklessness" qualifies as the requisite criminal intent, so that if someone ought to have recognized a risk and nevertheless proceeded, he may be held criminally liable. A novel aspect of the law on intention is that if one intends to harm somebody, it matters not who is actually harmed through the defendant's actions. The doctrine of transferred malice means, for instance, that if a man strikes another with his belt, but the belt bounces off and hits a nearby woman, the man is guilty of battery toward her. Malice can also be general, so that terrorists who plant bombs to kill random people are certainly guilty.

The final requirement states that both an actus reus and a mens rea coincide. For instance, in R v Church, For instance, Mr. Church had a fight with a woman which rendered her unconscious. He attempted to revive her, but gave up, believing her to be dead. He threw her, still alive, in a nearby river, where she drowned. The court held that Mr. Church was not guilty of murder (because he did not ever desire to kill her), but was guilty of manslaughter. The "chain of events", his act of throwing her into the water and his desire to hit her, coincided. In this manner, it does not matter when a guilty mind and act coincide, as long as at some point they do.

R v Steane [1947] KB 997, defective intent to help the Nazis, by doing radio broadcasts, rather than help family
Fagan v Metropolitan Police Commissioner [1969] 1 QB 439
R v Parker [1977] 1 WLR 600
R v Heard [2007] EWCA Crim 125
R v Faulkner (1877) 13 Cox CC 550  mens rea for one act does not transfer to others

Strict liability

Not all crimes have a mens rea requirement, or the threshold of culpability required may be reduced. For example, it might be sufficient to show that a defendant acted negligently, rather than intentionally or recklessly. In offences of absolute liability, other than the prohibited act, it may not be necessary to show anything at all, even if the defendant would not normally be perceived to be at fault.

England and Wales has strict liability offences, which criminalize behavior without the need to show a criminal mens rea. Most strict liability offences are created by statute, and often they are the result of ambiguous drafting. They are usually regulatory in nature, where the result of breach could have particularly harmful results. An example is drunk driving.

R v Woodrow (1846) 15 M&W 404 selling impure food, strict liability, overturning R v Dixon (1814) 3 M. & S. 11 that required mens rea
R v Stephens (1866) LR 1 QB 702 strict liability for dumping refuse into a river, despite the defendant (ostensibly) having no knowledge
Betts v Armstead (1888) LR 20 QBD 771 
Fitzpatrick v Kelly (1873) LR 8 QB 337 food safety
Sweet v Parsley [1970] AC 132 mens rea needed for liability for cannibis being smoked on premises, statutory construction presumes a mens rea
R v Lambert [2001] UKHL 37, cocaine possession claiming no knowledge
Road Traffic Act 1988 s 3ZB

Corporate crime

Serious torts and fatal injuries occur as a result of actions by company employees, have increasingly been subject to criminal sanctions. All torts committed by employees in the course of employment will attribute liability to their company even if acting wholly outside authority, so long as there is some temporal and close connection to work. It is also clear that acts by directors become acts of the company, as they are "the very ego and centre of the personality of the corporation." But despite strict liability in tort, civil remedies are in some instances insufficient to provide a deterrent to a company pursuing business practices that could seriously injure the life, health and environment of other people. Even with additional regulation by government bodies, such as the Health and Safety Executive or the Environment Agency, companies may still have a collective incentive to ignore the rules in the knowledge that the costs and likelihood of enforcement is weaker than potential profits. Criminal sanctions remain problematic, for instance if a company director had no intention to harm anyone, no mens rea, and managers in the corporate hierarchy had systems to prevent employees committing offences. One step toward reform is found in the Corporate Manslaughter and Corporate Homicide Act 2007. This creates a criminal offence for manslaughter, meaning a penal fine of up to 10 per cent of turnover against companies whose managers conduct business in a grossly negligent fashion, resulting in deaths. Without lifting the veil there remains, however, no personal liability for directors or employees acting in the course of employment, for corporate manslaughter or otherwise. The quality of a company's accountability to a broader public and the conscientiousness of its behaviour must rely also, in great measure, on its governance.

Criminal Finances Act 2017
Proceeds of Crime Act 2002

Participatory and inchoate offences

Encouraging or assisting crime - Part 2 of the Serious Crime Act 2007
Soliciting to murder, contrary to section 4 of the Offences against the Person Act 1861
Aiding, abetting, counselling or procuring the commission of an offence
Conspiracy, contrary to section 1(1) of the Criminal Law Act 1977
Conspiracy to defraud
Conspiracy to corrupt public morals
Conspiracy to outrage public decency
Attempt, contrary to section 1(1) of the Criminal Attempts Act 1981

Parts 1 to 3 of Schedule 3 to the Serious Crime Act 2007 list numerous statutory offences of assisting, encouraging, inciting, attempting or conspiring at the commission of various crimes.

R v Shivpuri [1986] UKHL 2, reversing Anderton v Ryan [1985] AC 560 attempting the impossible 
R v Anderson [1986] AC 27
R v Betts and Ridley (1930) 22 Cr App R, accessory to crime need not be present
R v Clarkson (1971) 55 Cr. App. Rep. 445 for aiding and abetting, need evidence of actually encouraging a crime
R v Gnango [2011] UKSC 59 joint enterprise
R v Jogee [2016] UKSC 8 joint enterprise in a stabbing, need to act or encourage an offence
R v Reed [1982] Crim. L.R. 819 suicide pact conspiracy
R v Richards [1974] 1 QB 776 accomplice cannot be convicted of worse offence than the main actor even if he has the mens rea for one

Inchoate
Serious Crime Act 2007 ss 44-46
Criminal Law Act 1977 ss 1-5
Criminal Justice Act 1987 s 12 and 1988 s 39
Wai Yu-tsang v R [1992] 1 AC 269 
R v Stracusa (1990) 90 Cr App R 340
R v Sadique [2013] EWCA Crim 1150

Complicity
R v Stringer (Ian) [2012] EWCA Crim 1396
R v Rook [1993] Crim LR 698
R v Giametto [1997] 9 Cr App R 1
R v Daley [2015] EWCA Crim 1515
Terrorism Act 2000 s 11

Criminal offences

Homicide

R v Wallace (1931) 23 Cr App R 32 murder conviction overturned for being unreasonable
R v Adams [1957] Crim LR 365
R v Hancock [1985] UKHL 9, foresight needed for murder
R v Dear [1996] Crim LR 595 chain of causation not broken for murder when wounds reopened by victim
R v Woollin [1999] 1 AC 82
R v Golds [2016] UKSC 61 
Road Traffic Act 1988 s 143
Infanticide Act 1938 s 1
Homicide Act 195 ss 2-4
R v Adomoako
R v Ahluwalia
Attorney General's Reference (No 3 of 1994) [1998] AC 245
R v Brennan [2014] EWCA Crim 2387
R (Nicklinson) v Ministry of Justice [2014] UKSC 34

Sexual offences

Sexual Offences Act 1956
Sexual Offences Act 2003
Protection from Harassment Act 1997 ss 1-4
R v R [1991] UKHL 12 a husband can be convicted of raping wife
R v Evans and McDonald [2012] EWCA Crim 2559 rape verdict overturned
R v Bowden [2000] 2 All ER 418, child pornography
R v Prince (1875) LR 2 CCR 154 responsibility for underage sex even though belief girl was 18, not 14
R v Penguin Books Ltd DH Lawrence, Lady Chatterley's Lover (1960) and the Obscene Publications Act 1959 
R v Peacock [2012] conviction quashed under the Obscene Publications Act 1959 for hardcore pornography
R v Oluboja [1982] QC 320
R v McNalley [2013] EWCA Crim 1051
R v Bree [2007] EWCA Crim 804
R v B [2013] EWCA Crim 823
R (F) v DPP [2013] EWHC 945

Other personal offences

Offences Against the Person Act 1861 
R v Savage [1992] UKHL 1, mens rea for assault
R v Coney (1882) 8 QBD 534, bare knuckle fight with consent still assault and actual bodily harm
R v Brown [1993] UKHL 19 consent not a defence to sadomasochistic harm 
Offences against the Person Act 1861
R v Constanza [1997] 2 Cr App Rep 492 meaning of assault, need not be immediate
Serious Crime Act 2007
Protection from Harassment Act 1997 ss 1-4
R v Wilson (Alan) [1997] QC 47
R v Colohan [2001] EWCA Crim 1251
Mental Capacity Act 2005 ss 2-3

Theft and property crime

Theft Act 1968 and Theft Act 1978
Offences under the Explosive Substances Act 1883
Offences under the Computer Misuse Act 1990
Oxford v Moss (1979) 68 Cr App Rep 183, information could not be property
R v Morris; Anderton v Burnside [1984] UKHL 1 meaning of "appropriates"
R v Hinks [2000] UKHL 53 meaning of "appropriates"
R v Lawrence v Metropolitan Police Commissioner [1972] AC 262, appropriation of property, taxi cab
R v Marshall [1998] 2 Cr App R 282
R v Hall [1973] 1 QB 126
R v Hale [1979] Crim LR 596
R v Bloxham [1983] AC 109
R v Gomez [1993] AC 442
R v Hayes [2015] EWCA Crim 1944
Haughton v Smith [1975] AC 476, no crime of handling when goods not stolen
Burglary and Blackmail
R v Collins [1973] QB 100, entering as a trespasser for burglary
R v Garwood [1987] Crim LR 476
Unauthorised access to computer material
Unauthorised impairment of a computer
Impairing a computer to cause damage

Fraud

Fraud Act 2006
Ivey v Genting Casinos (UK) Ltd [2017] UKSC 67, Ivey was unable to claim £7.7m in winnings from the Genting Casinos because he had won by cheating, by ‘edge sorting’ with an accomplice, at a card game called Punto Banco. Supreme Court held the 'fact-finding tribunal' should establish a defendant's actual state of mind and then judge whether their conduct was honest or not according to the objective standards of ordinary decent people.
Theft Act 1968 s 32 ‘cheating the Revenue’ is an offence
R v Chaytor [2010] UKSC 52, false accounting for Parliamentary expenses, no privilege protection
R v Ingram [2003] EWCA Crim, cheating by coughing to win Who wants to be a millionaire
R v Kylsant [1931] falsifying Royal Mail trading prospectus
R v Valujevs [2014] EWCA Crim 2888
Forgery
Offences under Part I of the Forgery and Counterfeiting Act 1981
Falsification of pedigree, contrary to section 183(1)(b) of the Law of Property Act 1925
Improper alteration of the registers, contrary to section 124 of the Land Registration Act 2002
Offences under section 8 of the Non-Parochial Registers Act 1840
Offences under sections 36 and 37 of the Forgery Act 1861
Forgery of passport, contrary to section 36 of the Criminal Justice Act 1925
Offences under sections 133 and 135 of the County Courts Act 1984
Offences under section 13 of the Stamp Duties Management Act 1891; and supplementary offences under sections 14 and 15
Offences under section 6 of the Hallmarking Act 1973
Offences under section 126 of the Mental Health Act 1983
Offences under sections 121 and 122(6) of the Gun Barrel Proof Act 1868
Motor vehicle document offences:
Offences under section 97AA and 99(5) of the Transport Act 1968
Offences under section 65 of the Public Passenger Vehicles Act 1981
Offences under section 115 of the Road Traffic Regulation Act 1984
Offences under section 173 of the Road Traffic Act 1988
Offences under regulations 11(1) to (3) of the Motor Vehicles (E.C. Type Approval) Regulations 1992 (S.I. 1992/3107) made under section 2(2) of the European Communities Act 1972
Offences under section 44 of the Vehicles Excise and Registration Act 1994
Offences under regulations 10(1) to (3) the Motor Cycle (E.C. Type Approval) Regulations 1995 (S.I. 1995/1531) made under section 2(2) of the European Communities Act 1972
Offences under section 38 of the Goods Vehicles (Licensing of Operators) Act 1995
Personation
Personation of a juror
Offences under section 90(1) of the Police Act 1996
Offences under section 30(1) of the Commissioners for Revenue and Customs Act 2005
Offences under section 34 of the Forgery Act 1861
Offences under section 24 of the Family Law Reform Act 1969
Offences under section 60 of the Representation of the People Act 1983
Cheating (law)
Offences under section 17 of the Gaming Act 1845
Offences under section 1 of the Fraudulent Mediums Act 1951

Criminal damage

Criminal Damage Act 1971
R v G [2003] UKHL 50 subjective recklessness standard abolishing R v Caldwell [1982] AC 341
Morphitis v Salmon [1990] Crim LR 48, scratch to scaffolding pole was de minimis damage and not criminal
Crime and Disorder Act 1998 s 30
R v Steer [1987] UKHL
R v Hill and Hall (1989) 89 Cr App R 74

Offences against the state
High treason in the United Kingdom
Misprision of treason
Compounding treason
Treason felony
Attempting to injure or alarm the Sovereign, contrary to section 2 of the Treason Act 1842
Contempt of the sovereign
Trading with the enemy
Offences under the Official Secrets Acts 1911 to 1989
Offences under the Incitement to Disaffection Act 1934
Causing disaffection, contrary to section 91 of the Police Act 1996
Causing disaffection, contrary to section 6 of the Ministry of Defence Police Act 1987
Incitement to sedition or disaffection or promoting industrial unrest, contrary to section 3 of the Aliens Restriction (Amendment) Act 1919
Offences of procuring and assisting desertion under military law
Offences relating to terrorism
Offences of directing quasi military organisations and wearing uniforms for political purposes under the Public Order Act 1936
Piracy iure gentium
Piracy with violence, contrary to the Piracy Act 1837
Offences under the Slave Trade Act 1824
Offences under the Foreign Enlistment Act 1870
Offences under the Immigration Act 1971
Coinage offences under Part II of the Forgery and Counterfeiting Act 1981
Offences relating to public stores under the Public Stores Act 1875
Offences relating to military stores under military law
Offences against postal and electronic communication services
Misconduct in public office
Refusal to execute public office
Offences of selling public offices under the Sale of Offices Act 1551 and Sale of Offices Act 1809
Purchasing the office of clerk of the peace or under-sheriff, contrary to section 27 of the Sheriffs Act 1887
Cheating the public revenue
Offences under the Customs and Excise Management Act 1979
Tax evasion and money laundering offences
Offences against military law in the United Kingdom

Other offences
 Offences under the Misuse of Drugs Act 1971, the Intoxicating Substances (Supply) Act 1985, the Licensing Act 2003, section 7 of the Children and Young Persons Act 1933 and other provisions relating to tobacco, and the Drug Trafficking Act 1994.
 Offences under the Psychoactive Substances Act 2016.
Firearms and offensive weapons offences (see also Gun politics in the United Kingdom)
Offences under section 1(1) of the Prevention of Crime Act 1953
Offences under sections 139 and 139A of the Criminal Justice Act 1988
Offences under the Knives Act 1997
Offences under sections 75 to 77 of the Marriage Act 1949
Offences under section 2 of the Ecclesiastical Courts Jurisdiction Act 1860
Offences under section 7 of the Burial Laws Amendment Act 1880
Offences under section 59 of the Cemeteries Clauses Act 1847
Offences under articles 18 and 19 of the Local Authorities' Cemeteries Order 1977 (SI 1977/204)
Doing an act tending and intended to pervert the course of public justice – a.k.a. perverting the course of justice, defeating the ends of justice, obstructing the administration of justice
Concealing evidence, contrary to section 5(1) of the Criminal Law Act 1967
Contempt of court, specifically criminal contempt
Intimidation, contrary to section 51(1) of the Criminal Justice and Public Order Act 1994
Taking or threatening to take revenge, contrary to section 51(2) of the Criminal Justice and Public Order Act 1994
Perjury, contrary to section 1 of the Perjury Act 1911
Perjury, contrary to section 6 of the Piracy Act 1850
Offences under sections 2 to 4 of the Perjury Act 1911
Making a false statutory declaration, contrary to section 5 of the Perjury Act 1911
Offences under section 6 of the Perjury Act 1911
Fabrication of false evidence
Offences under section 89 of the Criminal Justice Act 1967
Offences under 106 of the Magistrates' Courts Act 1980
Offences under section 11(1) of the European Communities Act 1972
Escape
Permitting an escape
Assisting a prisoner to escape, contrary to section 39 of the Prison Act 1952
Breach of prison/breaking prison
Rescue/rescuing a prisoner in custody
Harbouring an escaped prisoner, contrary to section 22(2) of the Prison Act 1952
Taking part in a prison mutiny, contrary to section 1(1) of the Prison Security Act 1992
Offences under section 128 of the Mental Health Act 1983
Causing a wasteful employment of the police, contrary to section 5(2) of the Criminal Law Act 1967
Administering an unlawful oath, contrary to section 13 of the Statutory Declarations Act 1835
Offences under the Public Order Act 1986
Offences under section 31 of the Crime and Disorder Act 1998
Offences under Part V of the Criminal Justice and Public Order Act 1994
Offences under Part II of the Criminal Law Act 1977
Offences under the Protection from Eviction Act 1977
Bomb hoaxes, contrary to section 51 of the Criminal Law Act 1977
Offences against public morals and public policy
Bigamy, contrary to section 57 of the Offences against the Person Act 1861
Offences under section 2(1) of the Obscene Publications Act 1959 (see also Obscenity and Indecency)
Offences under section 2(2) of the Theatres Act 1968
Certain offences under the Postal Services Act 2000
Offences under section 1(1) of the Indecent Displays (Control) Act 1981
Offences under section 1(1) of the Protection of Children Act 1978
Offences under section 160 of the Criminal Justice Act 1988
Offences under section 170 of the Customs and Excise Management Act 1979 consisting of importation in breach of the prohibition under section 42 of the Customs Consolidation Act 1876
Offences under the Bribery Act 2010
Cruelty to animals
Environmental crime
Traffic offences
Mayhem
Kidnapping
False imprisonment
Cheating the public revenue
High treason
Misprision of treason
Compounding treason
Misconduct in public office
Refusal to execute public office
Public nuisance
Outraging public decency
Conspiracy to defraud
Conspiracy to corrupt public morals or to outrage public decency
Common assault aka assault
Battery
Assault with intent to rob

Criminal defences
The defences which are available to any given offence depend on the wording of the statute and rules of the common law. There are general defences. Insanity, automatism, mistake and self defence operate as defences to any offence. Inadvertence due to intoxication is a defence to all offences requiring proof of basic intent if the intoxication is involuntary, and in cases where the risk would not have been obvious to a reasonable and sober person and/or the defendant, if it is voluntary, and to offences that require proof of a specific intent. Duress and necessity operate as a defence to all crimes except murder, attempted murder and some forms of treason. Marital coercion is a defence to all crimes except treason and murder.

Connolly v DPP [2007] EWHC 237 (Admin) no Human Rights Act 1998 defence for sending graphic pictures of abortions, considered malicious
Director of Public Prosecutions v Camplin [1978] UKHL 2, provocation, now Coroners and Justice Act 2009 loss of control 
R v Oye [2013] EWCA Crim 1725
R v Quayle [2005] EWCA Crim 1415
R v Martin (Anthony) [2001] EWCA Crim 2245
R v Coley [2013] EWCA Crim 223
Re A [2001] 2 WLR 480
R v Hitchens [2011] EWCA Crim 1626
R v Howe [1987] AC 417
R v Ray (Steven)''' [2017] EWCA Crim 1391

Partial defences to murder

There are two main partial defences that reduce murder to manslaughter.

If one succeeds in being declared "not guilty by reason of insanity" then the result is going to an asylum, a clearly inadequate result for somebody suffering from occasional epileptic fits, and many conditions unrecognized by nineteenth century medicine. The law has therefore been reformed in many ways. One important reform, introduced in England and Wales by statute is the diminished responsibility defence. The requirements are usually more lax, for instance, being "an abnormality of mind" which "substantially impair[s] mental responsibility for his acts and omission in doing or being a party to the killing."

Loss of control may be pleaded under sections 54 and 55 of the Coroners and Justice Act 2009.

Infanticide now operates as a defence to both murder and manslaughter. See the Infanticide Act 1938 as amended by the Coroners and Justice Act 2009.

Insanity

Insanity is a deranged state of mind, and consequently no defence to strict liability crimes, where mens rea not is a requirement. An old case which lays down typical rules on insanity is M'Naghten's case where a man suffering extreme paranoia believed the Tory party of the United Kingdom, were persecuting him. He wanted to shoot and kill Prime Minister Sir Robert Peel, but got Peel's secretary in the back instead. Mr M'Naghten was found to be insane, and instead of prison, put in a mental hospital. The case produced the rules that a person is presumed to be sane and responsible, unless it is shown that (1) he was laboring under such a defect of reason (2) from disease of the mind (3) as not to know the nature and quality of the act he was doing, or if he did know it, that he did not know he was doing what was wrong. These elements must be proven present on the balance of probabilities.

"Defect of reason" means much more than, for instance, absent mindedness making a lady walk from a supermarket without paying for a jar of mincemeat. A "disease of the mind" includes not just brain diseases, but any impairment "permanent or transient and intermittent" so long as it is not externally caused (e.g. by drugs) and it has some effect on one's mind. So epilepsy can count, as can an artery problem causing temporary loss of consciousness (and a man to attack his wife with a hammer). Diabetes may cause temporary "insanity" and even sleep walking has been deemed "insane". "Not knowing the nature or wrongness of an act" is the final threshold which confirms insanity as related to the act in question. In R v Windle a man helped his wife commit suicide by giving her a hundred aspirin. He was in fact mentally ill, but as he recognized what he did and that it was wrong by saying to police "I suppose they will hang me for this", he was found not insane and guilty of murder.

Automatism

Automatism is a state where the muscles act without any control by the mind, or with a lack of consciousness. A successful automatism defence negatives the actus reus element of a crime. If someone raises this defence, then it is for the prosecution to disprove. Automatismic actions can be a product of insanity, or not. One may suddenly fall ill, into a dream like state as a result of post traumatic stress, or even be "attacked by a swarm of bees" and go into an automatic spell. However to be classed as an "automaton" means there must have been a total destruction of voluntary control, which does not include a partial loss of consciousness as the result of driving for too long.

Automatism can also be self-induced, particularly by taking medical treatment. Self-induced automatism can always be a defence to crimes of specific intent (such as murder, wounding or causing grievous bodily harm with intent, theft, robbery and burglary). But automatism is no defence to other crimes (i.e. of basic intent, e.g. manslaughter, assault and battery) if the defendant was reckless in becoming automatismic or it happens through alcohol or illegal drugs. Only where the defendant does not know his actions will lead to an automatismic state where he could harm something can self-induced automatism be a defence to these crimes. For example, in R v Hardie Mr Hardie took his girlfriend's Valium, because she had just kicked him out and he was depressed. She encouraged him to take them, to make him feel better. But he got angry and set fire to the wardrobe. It was held that he should not be convicted of arson because he expected the Valium to calm him down, and this was its normal effect.Hill v Baxter [1958] 1 QB 277, dangerous driving, when automatism possible

Intoxication

Technically, intoxication is not a defence, but negates the mens rea for specific intent offenses (e.g. it commutes a murder sentence to manslaughter). In other words, a defendant may have been so drunk, or drugged, that he was incapable of forming the criminal intention required. Voluntary intoxication is considered reckless, a state of basic intent, which means one cannot have one's sentence reduced for crimes of basic intent (e.g. manslaughter, assault, etc.). So for instance, in R v Sheehan and Moore two people threw petrol on a homeless person and set fire to him. They were cleared of murder, but were still convicted of manslaughter, since that is a crime of basic intent. Of course, it can well be the case that someone is not drunk enough to support any intoxication defence at all. On the other hand, if someone becomes involuntarily intoxicated, because his drink is laced or spiked, then the question is whether the normal mens rea was present at the incident's time. So where a blackmailer drugged a man's coffee, invited him to abuse a 15-year-old boy, and photographed it, the man was denied the defence of intoxication because the court simply did not believe that the man did not intend to commit the abuse.

Sometimes intoxicated people make mistakes, as in R v Lipman where the defendant took LSD, thought his girlfriend was a snake and strangled her. Here, intoxication operated as a defence because Mr Lipman was mistaken in his specific intent of killing a snake. But intoxication does not negate the basic intent crime of manslaughter, with his "reckless course of conduct" in taking drugs. Lastly, while a mistake about a person or the actual action is acceptable, a mistake about how much force to use to defend oneself is not. Using a sledgehammer to fend off an "attacker" after 20 pints of beer is disproportionate.R v O'Grady [1987] QB 995 voluntary intoxication

MistakeWilliams (Gladstone) [1987] 3 All ER 411, mistake of fact depends on reasonableness

Self defence

In all instances one may only use reasonable, and not excessive, force in self defence. In R v Clegg a soldier in Northern Ireland shouted at a car approaching a checkpoint to halt. When it did not, Mr Clegg fired three shots, killing a woman. She was hit in the back, and Mr Clegg was sentenced for murder because by then the car had passed, the force was excessive and there was no justification for self-defence. Another way of expressing the rule on defensive force is that it must be proportionate to the threat. For instance, as the notorious case of R v Martin shows, shooting a teenager in the back with a shotgun several times as he tries to escape is not a justified or proportionate exercise of self-defensive force for the Norfolk farmer, even if robbers had trespassed on his property. In that case, Mr Martin was found to have diminished responsibility for his actions, because he was mentally ill.

Duress

One who is "under duress" is forced into something. Duress can be a defence for all crimes, except murder, attempted murder, being an accessory to murder and treason involving the death of the Sovereign. 
In R v Howe it was held that to allow the defence of duress as a defence to murder would, in the words of Lord Hailsham, withdraw the protection of the criminal law from the innocent victim and cast the cloak of its protection upon the coward and the poltroon - ordinary people ought to be prepared to give up their lives to the person making the threat in preference to killing an innocent.R v Gotts, in a similar fashion, disallowed the defence of duress for someone charged with attempted murder, as the Lords could not see a reason why the defence should be open to an attempted murderer when it was not open to a murderer.

In order to prove duress, it must be shown that the defendant was induced by threats of death or serious physical injury to either himself or his family that he reasonably believed would be carried out and that also that "a sober person of reasonable firmness, sharing the characteristics of the accused" would have responded in the same way. Examples of someone's characteristics that might be relevant are age, gender, pregnancy, physical disability, mental illness, sexuality, but not IQ.

Using duress as a defence is limited in a number of ways. The accused must not have foregone some safe avenue of escape. The duress must have been an order to do something specific, so that one cannot be threatened with harm to repay money and then choose to rob a bank to repay it, because that choice implies free will. Intoxication is irrelevant to duress, but one cannot also say one is mistaken about duress, when intoxicated. Then a number of cases turn on the choice to join a gang, and inevitably do bad things. The rule is that where one is aware of the gang's nature and puts himself in a position where he could be threatened, duress is not a defence - joining a gang that carries out armed robberies probably precludes any duress defence but joining a gang that is not violent at the time of joining may not.R v Hasan [2005] UKHL 22, duress, threat of serious injury

Necessity

Whilst a duress defence relates to the situation where a person commits an offense to avoid death or serious injury to himself or another when threatened by a third party, the defence of necessity related to the situation where a person commits an offense to avoid harm which would ensue from circumstances in which he/she or another are placed. Duress operates as an excuse but necessity operates as a justification, rendering the defendant's conduct lawful. Necessity is a defence that argues "I desperately needed to do X, because consequence Y would have been really bad." Logically, this is identical to the concept of "duress of circumstance", where the situation rather than a person is the threat. The common elements are (1) an act is done to prevent a greater evil (2) the evil must be directed to the defendant or someone for who he is responsible (3) the act must have been a proportionate response. But only necessity is a potential defence for murder.

The defence of necessity was first tested in the 19th century English case of R v Dudley and Stephens. The Mignotte, sailing from Southampton to Sydney, sank. Three crew members and a cabin boy were stranded on a raft. They were starving and the cabin boy close to death. Driven to extreme hunger, the crew killed and ate the cabin boy. The crew survived and were rescued, but put on trial for murder. They argued it was necessary to kill the cabin boy to preserve their own lives. Lord Coleridge, expressing immense disapproval, ruled, "to preserve one's life is generally speaking a duty, but it may be the plainest and the highest duty to sacrifice it." The men were sentenced to hang, but public opinion, especially among seafarers, was outraged and overwhelmingly supportive of the crew's right to preserve their own lives. In the end, the Crown commuted their sentences to six months.

Since then, in the 1970s, in several road traffic cases, although obiter dicta, it has been stated that there is a defence of necessity. In Johnson v Phillips [1975], Justice Wein stated that a police constable would be entitled to direct motorists to disobey road traffic regulations if this was reasonably necessary for the protection of life or property. In a later case, Woods v Richards, Justice Eveleigh stated that the defence of necessity depended on the degree of emergency which existed or the alternative danger to be averted. In DPP v Harris a police officer, charged with driving without due care and attention through a red traffic light contrary to s 3 of the Road Traffic Act 1988, and having collided with another vehicle containing armed robbers whilst pursuing that vehicle, was not allowed to advance the defence of necessity. Again in Chicon v DPP [1994] the defence of necessity was not allowed in a case of a pit bull terrier dog being kept in a public place without a muzzle - the owner had removed the muzzle to allow the dog to drink. But in the case of In re F (Mental Patient Sterilization), the defence of necessity was allowed. In the case of R v Bournewood Community and Mental Health NHS Trust, the defence of necessity (in the case of Tort law) was recognized and applied by the House of Lords to justify the informal detention and treatment of a mentally incompetent person who had become a danger to himself.  This approach was subsequently found to be a violation of Article 5 of the European Convention of Human Rights by the European Court of Human Rights in HL v United Kingdom.  Subsequent to this decision, individuals who lack capacity must be deprived of their liberty in accordance with the Deprivation of Liberty Safeguards (an amendment to the Mental Capacity Act 2005), not under the common law doctrine of necessity.

But more recently, duress of circumstance and necessity have been recognized and used by courts. In a leading case, Re A (Conjoined Twins), conjoined twins were born, one reliant on the other for her heart and lungs. Unless they were separated, both would die, but if separated, the reliant twin would die, the doctors therefore being liable to prosecution for murder. It was, however, held that in this special and incredibly sensitive situation, that the separation was necessary to save the first twin's life.

Procedure and sentencing

In the United Kingdom, a criminal case against Mr Smith is styled R v Smith. "R" is short for Rex or Regina, that is, the King or Queen, and the "v" stands for "versus".Woolmington v DPP [1935] UKHL 1, presumption of innocenceRice v Connolly [1966] 2 QB 414, right to refuse to answer questions if not under arrest
Judges' Rules (1912), adverse inferences not to be drawn from silence before arrest. The rule was already long established at common law in relation to silence during trial; both rules were weakened by the Criminal Justice and Public Order Act 1994R v Waterfield [1963] 3 All E.R. 659 police power to stop and detain, an assault charge against an officer was invalid as the officer was not acting in execution of duty R v Cheshire [1991] 1 WLR 844 role of the jury in finding causationConnelly v DPP [1964] AC 1254 no double jeopardy, but can be tried a second time for a different offence. The rule against double jeopardy was weakened by the Criminal Justice Act 2003R v Wang [2005] 1 WLR 661 judge cannot direct a jury to find a guilty verdictR v Davis [2008] UKHL 36, witness anonymityR v Incedal and Rarmoul-Bouhadjar'' (2014) terrorism trial not to be held in secret
Hearsay in English law

There is a Sentencing Council. This power is now created by section 163 of the Criminal Justice Act 2003

It was formerly created by each of the following provisions in turn:
The Criminal Justice Act 1948, section 13. Only applied to felony.
The Criminal Law Act 1967, section 7(3). Only applied where no enactment specified a maximum fine.
The Powers of Criminal Courts Act 1973, section 30(1). Amended by the Crime (Sentences) Act 1997, section 55 and Schedule 4, paragraph 8(3). The Criminal Law Act 1977, Schedule 13 repealed "limiting the amount of the amount of the fine that may be imposed or" and see section 32(1) (removed all statutory limits on fines imposed on convictions on indictment). Repealed in part by the Criminal Justice Act 1991, Schedule 13.
The Powers of Criminal Courts (Sentencing) Act 2000, section 127.

A general power of Crown Court to impose a sentence of imprisonment on conviction on indictment is created by section 77 of the Powers of Criminal Courts (Sentencing) Act 2000

It was formerly created by each of the following provisions in turn:
The Criminal Law Act 1967, section 7(1)
The Powers of Criminal Courts Act 1973, section 18(1)

International criminal law

International law
Nuremberg Tribunal
International Criminal Court
International Criminal Tribunal for the Former Yugoslavia
International Criminal Tribunal for Rwanda
Rome Statute

Criminal law theory

Crime in the United Kingdom
Crime in London
Law enforcement in the United Kingdom

See also
Crown Prosecution Service
List of English criminal offences
English tort law
Scottish criminal law
Northern Irish criminal law
Lurking doubt

Notes

References

External links

 Directgov Crime and justice (Directgov, England and Wales)